Blue Hustler is a subscription based premium adult entertainment television channel distributed throughout Europe and Israel via digital cable and satellite television. It is owned by the Dutch-based company Sapphire Media International BV.

Blue Hustler offers softcore pornography aimed at a hetero male audience. It is the sister channel to Hustler TV and Hustler HD who specializes in hardcore pornography.

External links

References

British pornographic television channels
Pornographic television channels
Television pornography